Helena Palaiologina  was Queen consort of Cyprus (1428–1458); daughter of Theodore II Palaiologos.

Helena Palaiologina may also refer to:
 Helena Palaiologina of the Morea (1431–1473), Princess consort of Lazar Brankovic of Serbia; daughter of Thomas Palaiologos
 Helena Palaiologina (1442–1470), daughter of Demetrios Palaiologos, later taken into Sultan Mehmed II's harem
 Helena Dragaš (c.1372–1450), empress consort of Byzantine emperor Manuel II Palaiologos, venerated as a saint in the Greek Orthodox Church